Sir Donnell Justin Patrick Deeny , KC, SC (born 25 April 1950), styled as the Rt Hon Sir Donnell Deeny, is a mediator and arbitrator (ACIArb) and a former member of the Court of Appeal of Northern Ireland.
Sir Donnell is also member of the Court of Arbitration for Art at The Hague.

Born in Lurgan, Deeny was educated at Clongowes Wood College, Trinity College Dublin and Queen's University, Belfast. During his time in Trinity College he acted as Auditor of the College Historical Society, the oldest undergraduate debating society in the world. Donnell Deeny won the Irish Times University Debating Trophy three times, the only person ever to do so. He was called to the Bar of Northern Ireland in 1974 and took silk in March 1989. He was also called to the Bar of Ireland (Senior Counsel 1996), and to the Bar of England and Wales (as a bencher in the Middle Temple). Deeny was appointed a High Court judge on 6 September 2004, and was knighted some months afterwards. He was appointed as a Lord Justice of Appeal in September 2017 and a Privy Councillor in October 2017.

He was appointed in 2000 to the British Government's Spoliation Advisory Panel, which advises on claims relating to cultural objects lost during the Nazi era. He served two further terms before becoming chairman of the Panel in 2012.

Deeny had served as an Alliance Party Councillor on Belfast City Council in 1981–85, and was High Sheriff of Belfast in 1983, the first Catholic to hold office in the City since the Partition of Ireland.

Deeny was a member of the Arts Council of Northern Ireland in 1991–94, and its chairman 1994–98. He was President of the Ulster Architectural Heritage Society in 2006 to 2017; and president of the Irish Legal History Society in 2015- 2018; and the founding chairman, Ireland Chair of Poetry Trust in 1997–2008. He is a Deputy Lieutenant for the City of Belfast and an Honorary Member of the Royal Town Planning Institute.

He was elected as the 56th Pro-Chancellor of the University of Dublin in 2014.

References

External links
Belfast Telegraph article
Northern Ireland courts info
Biodata

Alumni of Queen's University Belfast
Alumni of Trinity College Dublin
Auditors of the College Historical Society
Deputy Lieutenants of Belfast
High Sheriffs of Belfast
Knights Bachelor
Northern Ireland King's Counsel
Irish Senior Counsel
Lawyers from Belfast
20th-century King's Counsel
21st-century King's Counsel
Members of the Middle Temple
Members of Belfast City Council
Living people
1950 births
Place of birth missing (living people)
People educated at Clongowes Wood College
High Court judges of Northern Ireland
Lords Justice of Appeal of Northern Ireland
Members of the Privy Council of the United Kingdom